Christoph Carl von Bülow (* 26 May 1716 in Glubenstein near Rastenburg, East Prussia, 1 July 1788 in Pasewalk) was the Royal Prussian General of the Cavalry, commander of the Dragoons regiment Markgraf von Anspach-Bayreuth, general inspector of the cavalry in Prussia, Knight of the Black Eagle Order, as well as official chief of Memel and Oletzkow.  His name is included on the Equestrian statue of Frederick the Great.
'

References

1716 births
1788 deaths
People from East Prussia
Generals of Cavalry (Prussia)
Prussian military personnel of the Seven Years' War
Prussian military personnel of the War of Bavarian Succession
Recipients of the Pour le Mérite (military class)